Otis Rush Jr. (April 29, 1934 – September 29, 2018) was an American blues guitarist and singer-songwriter. His distinctive guitar style featured a slow-burning sound and long bent notes. With qualities similar to the styles of other 1950s artists Magic Sam and Buddy Guy, his sound became known as West Side Chicago blues and was an influence on many musicians, including Michael Bloomfield, Peter Green and Eric Clapton.

Rush was left-handed and played as such; however, his guitars were strung with the low E string at the bottom, upside-down from typical guitarists.  He often played with the little finger of his pick hand curled under the low E for positioning. It is widely believed that this contributed to his distinctive sound. He had a wide-ranging, powerful tenor voice.

Early life
The son of farmers Julia Campbell Boyd and Otis C. Rush, Rush was born near Philadelphia, Mississippi in 1934. Rush was one of seven children and worked on a farm throughout his childhood. At the age of eight, Rush taught himself how to play guitar; he also sang in local church choirs.

Career
Rush moved to Chicago, Illinois, in 1948/49 and, after being inspired by Muddy Waters, made a name for himself playing in blues clubs on the South and West Side of the city. During this period he formed his own group, initially under the name Little Otis. From 1956 to 1958, he recorded for the independent label Cobra Records and released eight singles, some featuring Ike Turner or Jody Williams on guitar. His first single, "I Can't Quit You Baby", in 1956 reached number 6 on the Billboard R&B chart. During his tenure with Cobra, he recorded some of his best-known songs, such as "Double Trouble" and "All Your Love (I Miss Loving)."

Cobra Records went bankrupt in 1959, and Rush signed a recording contract with Chess Records in 1960. He recorded eight tracks for the label, four of which were released on two singles that year. Six tracks, including the two singles, were later included on the album Door to Door in 1969, a compilation also featuring Chess recordings by Albert King. Rush went into the studio for Duke Records in 1962, but only one single, "Homework" backed with "I Have to Laugh", was issued by the label. It was also released in Great Britain as Vocalion VP9260 in 1963. In 1965, he recorded for Vanguard; these recordings are included on the label's compilation album Chicago/The Blues/Today! Vol. 2. Rush began playing in other cities in the United States and in Europe during the 1960s, notably with the American Folk Blues Festival. Unoficial recordings at this festival in 1967 and at the University of Chicago Folkfest in 1966 were later released together with recordings of Little Walter. In 1969, his album Mourning in the Morning was released by Cotillion Records. Recorded at the FAME Studios in Muscle Shoals, Alabama, the album was produced by Michael Bloomfield and Nick Gravenites (then of the band Electric Flag). The sound incorporated soul music and rock, a new direction for Rush.

In 1971, Rush recorded the album Right Place, Wrong Time in San Francisco for Capitol Records, but Capitol did not release it. The album was finally issued in 1976, when Rush purchased the master from Capitol and had it released by P-Vine Records in Japan. Bullfrog Records released it in the United States soon after. The album has since gained a reputation as one of his best works. He also released some albums for Delmark Records and for Sonet Records in Europe during the 1970s, but by the end of the decade he had stopped performing and recording.

Rush made a comeback in 1985 with a U.S. tour and the release of a live album, Tops, recorded at the San Francisco Blues Festival.

Rush released Ain't Enough Comin' In in 1994, his first studio album in 16 years. Any Place I'm Goin''' followed in 1998, and he earned his first Grammy Award for Best Traditional Blues Album in 1999. Rush did not record a new studio album after 1998 but he continued to tour and perform until 2003, when he suffered a stroke. In 2002, he was featured on the Bo Diddley tribute album Hey Bo Diddley – A Tribute!, performing the song "I'm a Man", produced by Carla Olson. Rush's 2006 album Live...and in Concert from San Francisco, a live recording from 1999, was released by Blues Express Records. Video footage of the same show was released on the DVD Live Part 1 in 2003.

In June 2016, Rush made a rare appearance at the Chicago Blues Festival in Grant Park.  Chicago Mayor Rahm Emanuel honored Rush's appearance by declaring June 12 to be Otis Rush Day in Chicago.  Due to his ongoing health problems Rush was unable to play, but was present with his family.

Awards
Rush was elected to the Blues Hall of Fame in 1984.

In 2015, Rolling Stone ranked Rush number 53 on its 100 Greatest Guitarists list.

The Jazz Foundation of America honored Rush with a Lifetime Achievement Award on April 20, 2018 "for a lifetime of genius and leaving an indelible mark in the world of blues and the universal language of music."

Death
Rush died on September 29, 2018, from complications of a stroke. His death was announced on his website by his wife Masaki.

Gregg Parker, CEO and a founder of the Chicago Blues Museum said of Rush: "He was one of the last great blues guitar heroes. He was an electric god". Writing in The New York Times, Bill Friskics-Warren said, "A richly emotive singer and a guitarist of great skill and imagination, Mr. Rush was in the vanguard of a small circle of late-1950s innovators, including Buddy Guy and Magic Sam, whose music, steeped in R&B, heralded a new era for Chicago blues."

Selected discography
Original albums
1968 This One's a Good One (Blue Horizon)
1969 Mourning in the Morning (Cotillion)
1972 Blues Masters, Vol. 21974 Screamin' and Cryin' (Black & Blue)
1975 Cold Day in Hell (Delmark)
1976 So Many Roads (Delmark)
1976 Right Place, Wrong Time (Bullfrog)
1978 Troubles Troubles (Sonet)
1988 Tops (Blind Pig)
1989 Blues Interaction – Live in Japan 1986 (P-Vine)
1991 Lost in the Blues (Alligator ALCD4797)
1993 Live in Europe (Evidence Music ECD 26034-2)
1994 Ain't Enough Comin' In (This Way Up/Mercury)
1998 Any Place I'm Going (House of Blues)
2006 Live...and in Concert from San Francisco (Blues Express)
2009 Chicago Blues Festival 2001 (P-Vine)
2015 Double Trouble LIVE Cambridge 1973 (RockBeat Records)

Compilation albums
1969 Door to Door, with Albert King (Chess)
1989 I Can't Quit You Baby: The Cobra Sessions 1956–1958 (P-Vine)
2000 Good 'Uns: The Classic Cobra Recordings 1956–1958 (Westside)
2000 The Essential Otis Rush: The Classic Cobra Recordings 1956–1958 (Fuel 2000)
2002 Blue on Blues: Buddy Guy & Otis Rush (Fuel 2000)
2005 All Your Love I Miss Loving: Live at the Wise Fools Pub, Chicago (Delmark)
2006 Live at Montreux 1986 (Eagle Rock Entertainment) (joint performance with Eric Clapton and Luther Allison)
2015 Double Trouble: Live Cambridge 1973 (Rockbeat Records ROCCD 3220)

Singles
 1956 "I Can't Quit You Baby" / "Sit Down Baby" (Cobra 5000)
 1956 "My Love Will Never Die" / "Violent Love" (Cobra 5005)
 1957 "Groaning the Blues" / "If You Were Mine" (Cobra 5010)
 1957 "Jump Sister Bessie" / "Love That Woman" (Cobra 5015)
 1957 "She's a Good 'Un" / "Three Times a Fool" (Cobra 5023)
 1958 "Checking on My Baby" / "It Takes Time" (Cobra 5027)
 1958 "Double Trouble" / "Keep On Loving Me Baby" (Cobra 5030)
 1958 "All Your Love (I Miss Loving)" / "My Baby's a Good 'Un" (Cobra 5032)
 1960 "So Many Roads So Many Trains" / "I'm Satisfied" (Chess 1751)
 1960 "You Know My Love" / "I Can't Stop Baby" (Chess 1775)
 1962 "Homework" / "I Have to Laugh" (Duke 356)
 1969 "Gambler's Blues" / "You're Killing My Love" (Cotillion 44032)

DVDs 
2003 Live Part One (Blues Express)
2006 Live at Montreux 1986 (Eagle Rock Entertainment)

Footnotes

Further reading

 Carlo Rotello, "Otis Rush," New York Times Magazine, December 27, 2018.

External links

 Official website
 
 Otis Rush at setlist.fm
 Obituary at Rolling Stone''
 Obituary at ultimateclassicrock.com

1934 births
2018 deaths
Chicago blues musicians
Electric blues musicians
Singers from Mississippi
African-American guitarists
American blues singers
American blues guitarists
American male guitarists
Singers from Chicago
People from Philadelphia, Mississippi
Grammy Award winners
Alligator Records artists
Chess Records artists
Delmark Records artists
Duke Records artists
Vanguard Records artists
P-Vine Records artists
Cobra Records artists
Blues musicians from Mississippi
Male guitarists
Guitarists from Chicago
Guitarists from Mississippi
20th-century American guitarists
20th-century American male musicians
Black & Blue Records artists
Blind Pig Records artists
20th-century African-American musicians
21st-century African-American people